Johnson City Airport may refer to:
Greater Binghamton Airport (IATA: BGM), serving Johnson City, New York
Tri-Cities Regional Airport (IATA: TRI), serving Johnson City, Tennessee